The 2016–17 Liga EBA season was the 23rd edition of the Liga EBA. This is the fourth division of Spanish basketball. Four teams will be promoted to LEB Plata. The regular season started in September 2016 and will ended in March 2017. The Final Stage to LEB Plata was played in April 2017.

Format

Regular season
Teams are divided in five groups by geographical criteria. Groups A, C and D are divided in two.

Group A–A: Asturias, Galicia and Castile and León
Group A–B: Basque Country, Cantabria, Castile and León and Navarre
Group B: Community of Madrid, Castile-La Mancha and Canary Islands.
Groups C–A: Aragon, Catalonia and Balearic Islands.
Groups C–B: Catalonia and Balearic Islands.
Group D–A: Andalusia and Melilla.
Group D–B: Andalusia and Extremadura.
Group E: Valencian Community and Region of Murcia.

Final stage
The three best teams of each group and the fourth of Group D (champion of the previous season) will play the Final Stage. From these 16 teams, only four will be promoted to LEB Plata. The winner of each group can organize a group stage.

The Final Stage will be played round-robin format in groups of four teams where the first qualified of each group will host one of the stages.

Regular season

Group A

Group A–A

Group A–B

Finals

First-qualified teams playoff
The winner of this single-legged series hosted one of the four groups of the final stage. The game was played at the Palacio de Deportes of Santander.

|}

Qualifying playoffs
The winner would qualify for the final stage. The games were played the Palacio de Deportes of Santander.

Group B

Group C

Group C–A

Group C–B

Finals

Qualifying playoffs
The games was played at Santa Ponça.

Relegation playoffs

|}

Group D

Regular season

Group D–A

Group D–B

Second stage

Group D–Qualification

Group D–Relegation

Finals

Group E

Regular season

Second stage

Group E–Qualification

Group E–Relegation

Promotion playoffs
The 16 qualified teams were divided in four groups of four teams. The first qualified teams hosted the groups, played with a round-robin format.

The winner of each group promoted to LEB Plata.

Group 1 – Cazorla

Group 2 – Murcia

Group 3 – Santander

Group 4 – Villaviciosa de Odón

References

External links
Liga EBA at FEB.es

Liga EBA seasons
EBA